Isabel Fay is a British children's screenwriter, formerly a comedy writer and performer.

Early life and education

Fay was born in Bath in 1979  and graduated from Royal Holloway University of London in 2001 with a 2:1 BA (Hons).

Career

TV, film and radio

Fay has exclusively written TV comedy for children since 2016, having shifted her focus from comedy performing.

She has also worked as an actress in various roles.

External links
Fay's official homepage

References 

1979 births
Alumni of Royal Holloway, University of London
English television actresses
Living people
People from Bath, Somerset
English women comedians